This is a list of non-government schools in the state of New South Wales, current as of August 2017.

Closed schools
Abbotsholme College
The Australasian College Broadway
Mountains Christian Academy
Osborne Ladies' College

See also 
 List of government schools in New South Wales
 Lists of schools in Australia

External links 

Non-government